Stenodema is a genus of Palaearctic, Oriental and Nearctic plant bugs in the family Miridae and the tribe Stenodemini.

Species
According to BioLib the following are included:
subgenus Brachystira Fieber, 1858
 Stenodema calcarata (Fallén, 1807)
 Stenodema pilosa (Jakovlev, 1889)
 Stenodema trispinosa Reuter, 1904

subgenus Stenodema Laporte, 1833

 Stenodema algoviensis Schmidt, 1934
 Stenodema alpestris Reuter, 1904
 Stenodema alticola Zheng, 1981
 Stenodema angustala Zheng, 1981
 Stenodema antennata Zheng, 1981
 Stenodema brevinotum C.S. Lin, 1998
 Stenodema chinensis (Reuter, 1904)
 Stenodema crassipes Kiritshenko, 1931
 Stenodema curticollis (A. Costa, 1852)
 Stenodema curva Nonnaizab & Qi, 1996
 Stenodema daliensis Zheng, 1992
 Stenodema deserta Nonnaizab & Jorigtoo, 1994
 Stenodema dorsalis Say, 1832
 Stenodema elegans Reuter, 1904
 Stenodema falki Bliven, 1958
 Stenodema guentheri Heiss & J. Ribes, 2007
 Stenodema holsata (Fabricius, 1787)
 Stenodema hsiaoi L.Y. Zheng, 1981
 Stenodema imperii Bliven, 1958
 Stenodema khenteica Muminov, 1989
 Stenodema laevigata (Linnaeus, 1758)
 Stenodema longicollis Poppius, 1915
 Stenodema longula L.Y. Zheng, 1981
 Stenodema mongolica Nonnaizab & Jorigtoo, 1994
 Stenodema nigricallum Zheng, 1981
 Stenodema parvula Zheng, 1981
 Stenodema pilosipes Kelton, 1961
 Stenodema plebeja Reuter, 1904
 Stenodema qinlingensis Tang, 1994
 Stenodema rubrinervis Horváth, 1905
 Stenodema sequoiae Bliven, 1955
 Stenodema sericans (Fieber, 1861)
 Stenodema sibirica Bergroth, 1914
 Stenodema tibetum Zheng, 1981
 Stenodema turanica Reuter, 1904
 Stenodema vicinus Provancher, 1872
 Stenodema virens (Linnaeus, 1767)- type species (as Miris virens L.)

unplaced species

 Stenodema andina Carvalho, 1975
 Stenodema argentina Carvalho, 1975
 Stenodema columbiensis (Carvalho, 1985)
 Stenodema dohrni (Stål, 1859)
 Stenodema fritzi Carvalho & Carpintero, 1990
 Stenodema golbachi Carvalho & Carpintero, 1990
 Stenodema guaraniana Carvalho, 1975
 Stenodema insuavis (Stål, 1860)
 Stenodema javanicum Poppius, 1914
 Stenodema laolaonsis (Carvalho, 1985)
 Stenodema longicuneatus (Carvalho & Rosas, 1966)
 Stenodema noaensis Carvalho & Carpintero, 1990
 Stenodema panamensis (Distant, 1893)
 Stenodema praecelsa (Distant, 1891)

Gallery

References

External links

Miridae genera
Stenodemini